Niagara Falls/Niagara South Airport  is located near Niagara Falls, Ontario, Canada. The airport is located north of the Queen Elizabeth Way at Sodom Road (Regional Road 116) exit. The airstrip's main entrance is on Sodom Road. The main runway runs northwest to southeast and has a small loop at each end.

See also
 St. Catharines/Niagara District Airport
 Welland/Niagara Central Airport

References

Registered aerodromes in Ontario
Transport in Niagara Falls, Ontario